The 23rd Dáil was elected at the February 1982 general election on 18 February 1982 and met on 9 March 1982. The members of Dáil Éireann, the house of representatives of the Oireachtas (legislature), of Ireland are known as TDs. On 4 November 1982, President Patrick Hillery dissolved the Dáil at the request of the Taoiseach Charles Haughey after the loss of a vote of confidence. The 23rd Dáil is the third shortest Dáil in history, lasting  days.

Composition of the 23rd Dáil

Fianna Fáil, which formed the 18th Government of Ireland, is marked with a bullet.

Graphical representation
This is a graphical comparison of party strengths in the 23rd Dáil from March 1982. This was not the official seating plan.

Ceann Comhairle
On the meeting of the Dáil, John O'Connell (Ind), who had served as Ceann Comhairle in the previous Dáil, was proposed by Neil Blaney (IFF) and seconded by Garret FitzGerald (FG) for the position. He was elected without a vote.

TDs by constituency
The list of the 166 TDs elected is given in alphabetical order by Dáil constituency.

Changes

See also
Members of the 16th Seanad

References

External links
Houses of the Oireachtas: Debates: 23rd Dáil

 
23